Kapla Beel (also known as Kapla Bill and Kapla Bil) is a wetland and lake located  towards the south of Baniyakuchi-Haladhibari under Sarthebari revenue circle in Barpeta district of Assam.

Area
Total area of this lake is 25 ha.

Aquafauna

This lake is the habitat of a number of species of indigenous fishes like Kawai (Anabas testudineus), Magur (Walking catfish), Singi (Heteropneustes fossilis), Sol (Snakehead murrel), Puthi (Olive barb), Khalihana (Trichogaster fasciata), Barali (Wallago attu) etc.

See also
List of lakes of Assam

References

Lakes of Assam
Barpeta district